Peniophora albobadia is a species of crust fungus in the family Peniophoraceae. It is a saprobic fungus, forming spreading crusts on the bark of decaying twigs and fallen branches of many hardwood species. The species epithet is derived from albo-, white, and badi- meaning reddish-brown, the epithet accurately describing the vivid contrast between the fertile area and the margin. 

First described scientifically by Lewis David de Schweinitz in 1822, it was transferred to the genus Peniophora by Jacques Boidin in 1961. It is most commonly found in the United States.

The common name, "Giraffe Spots," was coined by a member of the New York Mycological Society, based on specimens found during surveys of the boroughs of NYC.

References

Fungi described in 1822
Fungi of North America
Fungal tree pathogens and diseases
Stone fruit tree diseases
Russulales
Taxa named by Lewis David de Schweinitz